Bob Nelson may refer to:

 Bob Nelson (songwriter) (1934–2015), Hawaiian songwriter
 Chicago Bob Nelson (1944–2013), harmonica player, songwriter
 Bob Nelson (linebacker) (born 1953), retired American football linebacker; played for the Buffalo Bills, San Francisco 49ers, and Oakland/Los Angeles Raiders
 Bob Nelson (comedian) (born 1956), American stand-up comedian and actor
 Bob Nelson (screenwriter) (born 1956), American screenwriter
 Bob Nelson (defensive tackle) (born 1959), American football nose tackle; played for Tampa Bay Buccaneers & Green Bay Packers
 Bob Nelson (center) (1920–1986), American football center

See also
 Robert Nelson (disambiguation)
 Bobby Nelson (disambiguation)
 Bert Nelson (disambiguation)
 Nelson (surname)
 Bob Neilson (1923–2014), New Zealand rugby player